The Electoral district of County of Camden was an electorate of the New South Wales Legislative Council at a time when some of its members were elected and the balance were appointed by the Governor.

The 1851 Electoral Act increased the number of members in the Council from 36 to 54, 18 to be appointed and 36 elected. From this time the district was split into two divisions each returning one member; the Eastern division of the County of Camden and the Western division of the County of Camden. In 1856 the unicameral Legislative Council was abolished and replaced with an elected Legislative Assembly and an appointed Legislative Council. The district was represented by the Legislative Assembly electorates of Eastern Division of Camden and Western Division of Camden.

Members

James Macarthur went on to represent Western Camden in the Legislative Assembly from 1856 while Henry Osborne represented Eastern Camden.

Election results

1843

1845 by-election
Roger Therry resigned in February 1845 as he had been appointed a judge of the Supreme Court of New South Wales for the District of Port Phillip.

1848

1851

See also
Members of the New South Wales Legislative Council, 1843–1851 and 1851-1856

References

Former electoral districts of New South Wales Legislative Council
1843 establishments in Australia
1856 disestablishments in Australia